Iddo Goldberg (born 5 August 1975) is an Israeli-British actor born in Israel. He is known for his roles as Ben in Secret Diary of a Call Girl, Freddie Thorne in Peaky Blinders, Isaac Walton in Salem and Bennett Knox in Snowpiercer.

Early life
Goldberg was born in Haifa, Israel, to a family of Jewish descent. He moved to London with his family at the age of 10. His father hails from Riga, Latvia, and emigrated to Northern Rhodesia (present-day Zambia) during the 1930s, obtaining a degree in architecture from a British university. Goldberg's mother's family is based in Jerusalem, Israel. His parents first met when his father arrived in Israel for a vacation. They raised him in Israel and later he went to secondary school at JFS in North London along with his siblings. He also has family relatives in Haifa, Israel.

Career
Goldberg has had several notable roles, including Brandon in the two series of Attachments and Ben on Secret Diary of a Call Girl, where his then girlfriend Ashley Madekwe also had a regular role. He appeared as semi-regular 15Peter20 in Chris Morris and Charlie Brooker's short-lived comedy Nathan Barley. He appeared in the 2008 war film Defiance.

In 2013, Goldberg starred as Freddie Thorne in the first series of the BBC Two crime drama Peaky Blinders. He co-starred in the 2012 film And While We Were Here.

In addition to a Tumblr account that features his photographs, Goldberg makes short films that are posted there. He directed the short Supper (2012) with Joey Slotnick and Lauren Katz and music videos by James Rousseau, Anyone (Acoustic/Live) (2012) and Hair of the Dog (2012). Goldberg made a film about his maternal grandmother called Luba (2010).

In 2015 he appeared in the music video for the Disclosure song "Magnets" alongside Lorde.

Goldberg played villain T. O. Morrow and his android Red Tornado in the CBS series Supergirl in 2015.

Between 2014 and 2017 he starred in Salem, alongside his wife Ashley Madekwe.

Personal life
He married his long-time girlfriend, English actress Ashley Madekwe, in June 2012.

Filmography

Film

Television

Web

Music Videos

References

External links
 
 

1975 births
20th-century British male actors
21st-century British male actors
British male film actors
British male television actors
English people of Israeli descent
British people of Latvian-Jewish descent
Israeli emigrants to the United Kingdom
Jewish British male actors
Jewish Israeli male actors
Living people
People from Haifa
Israeli Ashkenazi Jews
British Ashkenazi Jews